Estadio Nacional Jorge "Mágico" González is a football stadium in San Salvador. It is named after Salvadoran star player Mágico González. The stadium has a capacity of 35,000 and was previously known as "Estadio Nacional Flor Blanca", referring to the name of the San Salvador neighborhood where it is located.

The stadium was restored in 2001 to host notable sporting events in Latin America, the Central American and Caribbean Games in August 2002.

History
The Estadio Nacional was constructed in 1932 by Maximiliano Hernández Martínez for the 1935 Central American and Caribbean Games. The name Flor Blanca was named after the location of the stadium  (49 North Avenue, Colonia Flor Blanca, San Salvador).

In 2002, as part of the 70th anniversary of its construction and organization of the 2002 Central American and Caribbean Games, it would hold the largest renovation in its history, where it doubled its initial capacity, and was fully modernized. The renovation includes the installation of 20,000 seats for the convenience of the spectators and track facilities for more modern and the installation of functional Tartan Central, where they have made the most important athletic competition of the Isthmus.

In 2006, 74 years after its construction, the government of President Elías Antonio Saca González, decides to change its name to Estadio Nacional Jorge "Mágico" González, after the footballer in El Salvador.

In 2010, the stadium was used for the eleventh season of the Dutch TV-show Wie is de Mol?

Renovations
In September 2021, It was announced by the National Institute of Sports of El Salvador (INDES) that it agreed a 22 million dollar loan with the Central American Bank for Economic Integration (CABEI) to complete a renovation. The renovation will include the development of new stands, a new pitch, athletics track, irrigation system, lighting and drainage, as well as improved access for people with disabilities. They will also build a museum dedicated to González will form part of the renovation project. The project is expected to be completed in February 2023.

Important events 
 1935 Central American and Caribbean Games
 1963 CONCACAF Championship
 1977 Central American Games
 1994 Central American Games
 2002 Central American and Caribbean Games
 2003 Maná Revolución de Amor Tour
 2006 Shakira Oral Fixation Tour
 2016 Iron Maiden the book of souls world tour
 2023 Central American and Caribbean Games

References

External links

Football venues in San Salvador
Athletics (track and field) venues in El Salvador
Football venues in El Salvador
Buildings and structures in San Salvador